Algisto Lorenzato (May 20, 1910 – July 16, 1960), usually known as Batatais (after the Brazilian city where he was born), was a football (soccer) goalkeeper.

In career, started at early 1930s at Comercial Futebol Clube of Ribeirão Preto, he played for Portuguesa, Palmeiras, Fluminense and América-RJ where close his career in 1948.

He won five Rio de Janeiro State Tournament in 1936, 1937, 1938, 1940 and 1941. For Brazil national football team he participated at 1938 FIFA World Cup and played two matches.

He died in Rio de Janeiro at age 50.

References

1910 births
1960 deaths
Brazilian footballers
Brazil international footballers
Association football goalkeepers
America Football Club (RJ) players
Comercial Futebol Clube (Ribeirão Preto) players
Fluminense FC players
Sociedade Esportiva Palmeiras players
1938 FIFA World Cup players
Brazilian people of Italian descent
Footballers from São Paulo (state)
People from Batatais